Nova Olímpia (Portuguese meaning "New Olympia") may refer to the following places in Brazil:

Nova Olímpia, Mato Grosso
Nova Olímpia, Paraná